Simon Copeland (born 10 October 1968) is a former English  footballer who played as a defender.

References

1968 births
Living people
English footballers
Association football defenders
Rochdale A.F.C. players
English Football League players
Sheffield United F.C. players